H. Steven Blum (born October 13, 1946) is a retired United States Army lieutenant general. He served as the 25th chief of the National Guard Bureau from 2003 to 2008. His last assignment before retiring was deputy commander, United States Northern Command, where he concurrently served as vice commander, United States Element, North American Aerospace Defense Command. He retired from the Army National Guard on May 21, 2010.

Early life and education
Blum was born in Baltimore, Maryland, on October 13, 1946. He attended Forest Park High School, graduating in 1963. He obtained his Bachelor of Arts degree in history from the University of Baltimore in 1968.

Soon after graduating, Blum enlisted in the Maryland Army National Guard. His unit was activated in April 1968, in response to the Baltimore riot of 1968 that broke out following the assassination of Martin Luther King Jr. Blum would later recall that "he heard more shots fired in the weeks he worked downtown Baltimore's streets than during any of his other deployments – at home or abroad."

Blum taught United States history at Pimlico Junior High School before accepting a full-time position with the Army National Guard in 1971. He received a Master of Science degree in social science from Morgan State College in 1973.

Blum is Jewish, and is a member of Jewish War Veterans.

Military career
Blum received his commission from Officer Candidate School on August 28, 1971, graduating with honors. He subsequently carried out staff and command assignments at every level from platoon to division, including command of a Special Forces Operational Detachment-A, Light Infantry Battalion, Infantry Brigade, and Division Support Command.

Blum's general officer assignments included Assistant Adjutant General for the Maryland Army National Guard, assistant division commander (support) and commander of the 29th Infantry Division (Light), and chief of staff, United States Northern Command.

Operation Joint Forge
Blum served as commanding general for Multinational Division (North) Stabilization Force 10 in Bosnia and Herzegovina during 2001 and 2002 as part of Operation Joint Forge.

During his tenure at SFOR, Blum received high marks for his military and diplomatic ability to command and coordinate multiple units of various nations. In his last work, To America: Personal Reflections of an Historian, the late historian Stephen Ambrose compared Blum favorably to Dwight Eisenhower in World War II.

Chief of the National Guard Bureau

In April 2003 Blum was appointed chief of the National Guard Bureau and promoted to lieutenant general.

When his term expired in 2007 he received a two-year extension.

As chief of the National Guard Bureau, Blum was the senior uniformed National Guard officer, responsible for formulating, developing, and coordinating all policies, programs, and plans affecting more than half a million federalized and nonfederalized Army National Guard and Air National Guard personnel. Appointed by the U.S. president, he served as the principal adviser to the Secretary of Defense and Chief of Staff of the Army, and Chief of Staff of the Air Force on all National Guard issues.  His duties also included serving as the Army's and Air Force's official channel of communication with state governors and adjutants general concerning the 54 state and territorial National Guards.

Blum served as chief until November, 2008 and was succeeded by Craig R. McKinley.

United States Northern Command
Following his term as chief of the National Guard Bureau, Blum was assigned as Deputy Commander of the United States Northern Command.

As deputy commander, United States Northern Command, Blum helped lead the command to anticipate, prepare, and respond to threats and aggression aimed at the United States, its territories, and interests within the assigned area of responsibility and, as directed by the president or Secretary of Defense, provided defense support to civil authorities including consequence management operations.

He served at NORTHCOM until retiring in May, 2010.

Later work
After his retirement from the military, Blum accepted a position as managing director and group practice leader with the Sitrick Brincko Group.

He was also an Executive in Residence at Johns Hopkins University, School of Education, Division of Public Safety and Leadership.

As of 2012, Blum is affiliated with Blakely Educational Services, Inc., a firm which provides educational services to the United States military, its allies, and for other organizations.

NAACP Meritorious Service Award
On July 18, 2006, Blum was awarded the NAACP Meritorious Service Award at their 31st annual Armed Services and Veterans Affairs Awards banquet.  Some atheists and agnostics objected to certain remarks about their lack of religious belief, and his paraphrased repetition of the "no atheists in foxholes" assertion. According to Blum in his remarks: "The strength of this nation is that it's not homogeneous. We don't all look alike. We don't all think alike. We don't all play alike. We don't all have the same physical attributes."

Civilian education
1968 Bachelor of Arts degree in history, University of Baltimore, Baltimore, Maryland
1973 Master of Science in social science, Morgan State College, Baltimore, Maryland

Military education
United States Army War College (1989)
United States Army Command and General Staff College (1978)

In addition, Blum is a graduate of:

United States Army Airborne School (1969) 
Special Forces Operations Course (1971) 
Infantry Officer Basic Course (1972) 
Special Forces Jumpmaster Course (1973) 
First U.S. Army Counter-Sniper Course (1974) 
Infantry Officer Advanced Course (1975) 
Nuclear, Biological and Chemical Officer/Enlisted Course (1979) 
National Defense University, National Security Management Course (1981) 
Air Assault School (1986) 
Project Management Course (1989) 
National Guard Bureau Executive Environmental Leadership Seminar (1990) 
Defense Equal Opportunity Management Institute, Equal Opportunity Leadership Training (1991) 
National Guard Total Quality Leadership and Management Seminar on Facilitation and Team Leadership (1991) 
McManis Associates Seminar on Implementing Total Quality Leadership and Management (1991)

Assignments

 August 1971 – September 1972, S-3, Detachment B3, Company B, 19th Special Forces Group (Airborne), 1st Special Forces, Maryland Army National Guard
 October 1972 – August 1974, air operations officer, Headquarters Detachment, 5th Special Forces Battalion, 20th Special Forces Group, Maryland Army National Guard
 August 1974 – August 1976, Battalion S-2, Headquarters Detachment, 5th Special Forces Battalion, 20th Special Forces, Maryland Army National Guard
 September 1976 – November 1977, Recruiting and Retention Officer, Headquarters Detachment, Maryland Army National Guard
 November 1977 – August 1978, commander, Special Forces Operations Detachment-A, Company B, 5th Special Forces Battalion, 20th Special Forces, Maryland Army National Guard
 September 1978 – October 1978, Recruiting and Retention Officer, Headquarters Detachment, Maryland Army National Guard
 October 1978 – June 1981, Special Forces Operations Officer, Command and Control, Headquarters, Maryland Army National Guard
 July 1981 – September 1981, Marksmanship Program Administrator, Headquarters Detachment, Maryland Army National Guard
 October 1981 – September 1982, Training Administrator, Headquarters Detachment, Maryland Army National Guard
 October 1982 – November 1984, Director Plans, Operations and Training, Headquarters, State Area Command, Maryland Army National Guard
 December 1984 – July 1985, Mobilization Operations Officer, Headquarters, State Area Command, Maryland Army National Guard
 August 1985 – September 1987, battalion commander, Headquarters, 1st Battalion, 115th Infantry, 29th Infantry Division (Light), Maryland Army National Guard
 October 1987 – October 1988, executive officer, Headquarters, 3rd Brigade, 29th Infantry Division (Light), Maryland Army National Guard
 November 1988 – January 1989, Operations and training officer, Headquarters, State Area Command, Maryland Army National Guard
 January 1989 – August 1992, director, Plans, Operations, and Training, Headquarters, Maryland Army National Guard
 September 1992 – July 1995, commander, 3rd Brigade, 29th Infantry Division (Light), Maryland Army National Guard
 July 1995 – August 1996, commander, Division Support Command, 29th Infantry Division (Light), Maryland Army National Guard
 August 1996 – July 1999, assistant division commander, 29th Infantry Division (Light), Maryland Army National Guard
 August 1999 – October 2001, commanding general, 29th Infantry Division (Light), Virginia Army National Guard
 October 2001 – April 2002, commanding general, Multi National Division (North), Stabilization Force 10, Operation Joint Force, Bosnia and Herzegovina
 April 2002 – August 2002, commanding general, 29th Infantry Division (Light), Virginia Army National Guard
 August 2002 – April 2003, chief of staff, United States Northern Command, Peterson Air Force Base, Colorado
 April 2003 – November 2008, chief, National Guard Bureau, Arlington, Virginia
 January 2009 – May 21, 2010, deputy commander, United States Northern Command and vice commander, United States Element, North American Aerospace Defense Command, Peterson Air Force Base, Colorado

Awards and decorations

Dates of rank

References

External links

 LTG Blum USNORTHCOM Biography
 LTG Blum National Guard Biography

1946 births
Living people
Jewish American military personnel
University of Baltimore alumni
Morgan State University alumni
United States Army Command and General Staff College alumni
United States Army War College alumni
Recipients of the Defense Distinguished Service Medal
Recipients of the Distinguished Service Medal (US Army)
Recipients of the Defense Superior Service Medal
Recipients of the Legion of Merit
United States Army generals
National Guard (United States) generals
Chiefs of the National Guard Bureau
21st-century American Jews